Desiya Dravadar Makkal Munnetra Kazhagam (DDMMK)  (Tamil: தேசிய ட்ராவடார் மக்கள் முன்னேற்ற கழகம்; English: National Dravidian People's Progressive Federation) is a state political party formed by Rajinikanth in the Indian state of Tamil Nadu on 31 December 2017 in Coimbatore.

Formation
Rajinikanth announced entry into politics on 31 Dec 2017 and confirmed that his newly formed party will contest in assembly elections in 2021 from all 234 constituencies in Tamil Nadu state. His party, he said, would resign if it was unable to fulfill its electoral promises within three years of coming into power.

References

Dravidian political parties
Political parties in Tamil Nadu
2017 establishments in Tamil Nadu
Political parties established in 2017